Heart & Soul is the sixth compilation album by singer Stella Parton.

Track listing
The track listing is as follows:

"Something to Go By"
"The Sun Don't Shine in Memphis"
"I Hate the Night"
"Valley of Desire"
"Don't Put Me On"
"Lying to the One You're With (Wishing)"
"There's Nothing Between Us Now"
"Legs"
"I'll Miss You"
"We Are Gypsies"

References

Stella Parton albums
2008 compilation albums